The Miss Brazil World 1996 pageant took place on October 11, 1996. Each state and the Federal District (with the exception of Amapá) competed for the title of the Brazilian Crown for Miss World. The winner entered Miss World 1996. Anuska Prado of Espírito Santo ended being the winner at the end of the contest.

Results

Special Awards
Miss Congeniality - Pherla Aline Fischer
Best Casual Wear - Pherla Aline Fischer
Miss Evening Wear - Pherla Aline Fischer

Delegates
The delegates for Miss Brazil World 1996 were:

 - Lalsemi Luiza Silva
 - Patrícia Barreto Cavalcanti 
 - Jaci Leni Cardozo Nunes
 - Isolda Carla Vasconcelos de Almeida
 - Fátima Cristina Mendonça
 - Lucimara Fernandes
 - Anuska Prado
 - Joyce Emilita de Oliveira Queiroz
 - Shanna Cristina Botelho Barros
 - Velma Nelmane de Sousa Campos
 - Iara Soares
 - Pherla Aline Fischer
 - Cirlene Cristina Amorim Galvão
 - Ana Carla Vieira
 - Karina Luiza Bomm
 - Tatiana Galvão de Queiroga Lopes
 - Maria José Melo Meneses de Santana
 - Maria Gabriela Dias Gomes
 - Louisianne Soraya Drummond Alves
 - Patrícia Ferigolo
 - Fabrine Félix Fosse
 - Tatiana Reis Barbosa
 - Patrícia Stahnke Santos
 - Juliana Sarri Borges
 - Keila Viviane Santos Melo
 - Dhênia Gerhardt

Did not compete

References

External links
 Official site (in Portuguese)

1996
1996 in Brazil
1996 beauty pageants